The 2011 Formula Nippon Championship was the thirty-ninth season of the premier Japanese open-wheel motor racing series. The series for Formula Nippon racing cars was contested over seven rounds.

Teams and drivers

* Drivers who participated in the non-championship round at Fuji Speedway.

Race calendar and results

 All races will be held in Japan. A non-championship round, entitled Super GT and Formula Nippon Sprint Cup 2011, will be held at the conclusion of the season. The opening round at Suzuka was rescheduled from 16–17 April to 14–15 May due to the Tōhoku earthquake and tsunami that hit Japan in March. As a result, the first Twin Ring Motegi round scheduled for that weekend was rescheduled to 6 November with the originally scheduled Suzuka race moved forward to September.

Championship standings

Drivers' Championship
Scoring system

Teams' Championship

References

External links
2011 Japanese Championship Formula Nippon

Formula Nippon
Super Formula
Nippon